6ixense (pronounced "sixth sense") is the debut studio album by South Korean boy band AB6IX. It was released through Brand New Music on October 7, 2019, along with lead single "Blind for Love" and its music video. The album debuted at number two on the Gaon Album Chart and 25 on the Oricon Albums Chart. It is the final release with member Youngmin, before he left the group on June 8, 2020.

Promotion
Throughout late September and early October, various concept photos for the album and music video teasers were released through the band's social media.

AB6IX had the album showcase on October 7 at Kyung Hee University in Seoul where they performed title track "Blind For Love" along with "Be There" and "Deep Inside".

The group started promoting their title track "Blind For Love" on October 10. They first performed the lead single on Mnet's M Countdown, followed by performances on KBS' Music Bank, MBC's Show! Music Core and SBS' Inkigayo.

Critical reception
Billboards Jeff Benjamin called the single "Blind for Love" a second part to "Breathe" from B Complete, noting its "sleek house-inspired sound". He pointed out the variety of genres on the album, describing the songs "_And Me" and "Be There" as a "a blend of gentle pop and steely hip-hop", "Love Air" as featuring "tropical house vibes", "Pretty" as "staccato-piano pop", "Shadow" as having a "late-night EDM" sound and "Deep Inside" as containing "deep harmonies", while noting "D.R.E.A.M" is a "straightforward hip-hop cut" and closing track "Nothing Without You" a ballad.

Track listing
Credits adapted from Melon

Charts

Weekly charts

Monthly charts

Year-end charts

Sales

Awards

Music programs

Release history

References

Album chart usages for Oricon
2019 debut albums
AB6IX albums
Korean-language albums